The 2015–16 Scottish Junior Cup was the 130th season of the Scottish Junior Cup, the national knockout tournament for member clubs of the Scottish Junior Football Association. The competition was sponsored by ETHX Energy and known as The ETHXenergy Scottish Junior Cup. The winner of this competition entered the following season's Scottish Cup at the first round stage.

A total of 158 clubs entered this year's competition, three fewer than the previous season. Dropping out were Ballingry Rovers, who folded, and Harthill Royal, Luncarty, Portgordon Victoria and Whitehills, who were in abeyance. North Region sides Glentanar and Islavale did not enter. New members Easthouses Lily MW and Gartcairn FA Juniors made their debut in the competition, while Coupar Angus and Fochabers returned to the tournament after a year in abeyance.

First round
The six Junior clubs qualified for this season's Scottish Cup, were not included in the draw for the first round:
 Auchinleck Talbot - West of Scotland Super League Premier Division champions and Junior Cup holders
 Kelty Hearts - East Superleague champions
 Hermes - North Superleague champions

Also qualified automatically were Banks O'Dee and Linlithgow Rose who achieved national club licensing requirements and Girvan who qualify automatically as historic full members of the Scottish Football Association.

The first round draw took place at Hampden Park, Glasgow on 27 August 2015.

Replays

Second round
The second round draw took place at Mar Hall, Erskine on 6 October 2015.

Replays

Third round
The third round draw took place at The Sun offices in Glasgow on 3 November 2015.

1 Match played at Pollok F.C.

Replays

2 Match played at Tranent Juniors F.C.

Fourth round
The fourth round draw took place at the Evening Times offices in Glasgow on 9 December 2015.

3 Match played at Kennoway Star Hearts F.C.

Replay

Fifth round
The fifth round draw took place in Glasgow City Chambers on 26 January 2016.

Quarter-finals
The draw for the quarter-finals took place on 25 February 2016.

Replay

Semi-finals
The draw for the semi finals took place on 22 March 2016.

First leg

Second leg

Final
The Final of The ETHX Energy Junior Cup was played at Rugby Park, Kilmarnock on Sunday 29 May with a 4.05pm kick off. The game was televised live by BBC ALBA.

References

4
Scottish Junior Cup seasons